The South Galway Set is a set dance that hails from the Gort area of Galway, Republic of Ireland. It can be viewed on Volume 2 of the video series The Magic of Irish Set Dancing with instruction by the late Connie Ryan. Other published instructions include Terry Moylan's Irish Dances, Pat Murphy's Toss the Feathers and Tom Quinn's Irish Dancing. Joe O'Hara has two online versions of this set: a 4-couple workshop version and a traditional half set version.

The following instructions for the South Galway Set dance can also be found on the Newcastle Irish Set Dancers' website along with instructions for many more Irish Set Dances. They were copied here by the author of that page, Arthur Kingsland. Instructions for the Clare Lancers Set can also be found on Wikipedia.

Formation

 Square Set of four couples, Gents on the left of their partners. 1st Top Couple have their backs to the band, with 2nd Top Couple opposite them. 1st Side Couple are on the left of 1st Top Couple (when facing into the set) and 2nd Side Couple are opposite them (to the right of 1st Tops). All Couples dance all parts of each figure, except where described otherwise in Figure 4 (Tops on their own followed by Sides on their own).

Dance instructions

Figure 1: Reels (56 bars)

Figure 2: Reels (72 bars)

Figure 3: Reels (88 bars)

Figure 4: Jigs (88 bars)

Using Up jig steps...

Figure 5: Reels (72 bars)

Steps

All Advance and Retire movements, for both the jigs and the reels, are danced Forward 1-2-123 Back 1-2-123.

For Ladies starting on the right foot (t = toe):   R L  Rt-Lt-Rt  /   L R  Lt-Rt-Lt
For Gents starting on the left foot:   L  R  Lt-Rt-Lt /   R  L  Rt-Lt-Rt

Joe O'Hara notes that the set is danced quite flat, with some lift to the step – though not as much as in the Clare style – and little or no battering. The jig is danced with the rising (or up) jig step.

References

Moylan, Terry (1985). Irish Dances. Na Piobairi Ulleann: Dublin. 19–24.
Murphy, Pat (1995). Toss the Feathers. Cork: Mercier Press. 200–201.
Quinn, Tom (1977). Irish Dancing. Glasgow: Harper Collins. 421–424.

Web versions of this set
Joe O'Hara's website
4-couple workshop version of the South Galway Set
South Galway Set on Newcastle Irish Set Dancers' website
South Galway on DanceMinder

Irish set dance